The Roman Catholic Diocese of Catanduva is a diocese located in the city of Catanduva in the Ecclesiastical province of Ribeirão Preto in Brazil.

History
 9 February 2000: Established as Diocese of Catanduva from the Diocese of Jaboticabal, Diocese of Rio Preto and Diocese of São Carlos

Leadership
 Bishops of Catanduva (Roman rite)
Antônio Celso Queiroz (9 Feb 2000 - 21 Oct 2009)
Otacílio Luziano Da Silva (21 Oct 2009 - 10 Oct 2919)
Valdir Mamede (10 July 2019 - ...)

References
 GCatholic.org
 Catholic Hierarchy

Roman Catholic dioceses in Brazil
Christian organizations established in 2000
Catanduva, Roman Catholic Diocese of
Roman Catholic dioceses and prelatures established in the 20th century